is a subway station in Chiyoda, Tokyo, Japan, operated by the Tokyo subway operator Tokyo Metropolitan Bureau of Transportation (Toei). The station opened on March 16, 1980.

Lines
Ogawamachi Station is served by the Toei Shinjuku Line, and is located 6.5 km from Shinjuku Station. The station is numbered "S-07". It is connected to Awajichō Station on the Tokyo Metro Marunouchi Line and Shin-Ochanomizu Station on the Tokyo Metro Chiyoda Line via underground passages.

Layout
Ogawamachi Station has a single island platform on the 6th basement ("B6F") level, serving two tracks.

Platforms

History
The station opened on 16 March 1980.

Passenger statistics
In fiscal 2011, the station was used by an average of 64,205 passengers daily.

Surrounding area
The station is located underneath Tokyo Metropolitan Route 302 (Yasukuni-dōri) between Tokyo Metropolitan Routes 403 (Hongō-dōri) and 405 (Sotobori-dōri). The area is home to many mid-rise office buildings and scattered apartment buildings. Other points of interest include:
 Tokyo Metropolitan Police Department, Kanda Police Station
 Chiyoda City Hall, Kanda Park branch office
 Chiyoda Municipal Chiyoda Elementary School
 Kanda-Awajichō & Kanda-Nishikimachi post offices
 Tokyo Denki University
 School of Engineering
 School of Science and Technology for Future Life

See also
 List of railway stations in Japan
 Ogawamachi Station (Saitama)

References

External links

  

Railway stations in Japan opened in 1980
Railway stations in Tokyo
Kanda, Tokyo